Joseph Buffum Jr. (September 23, 1784 – February 24, 1874) was an American politician and a U.S. Representative from New Hampshire.

Early life
Born in Fitchburg, Worcester County, Massachusetts, Buffum attended the public schools and the local academy. He graduated from Dartmouth College in 1806, and studied law.

Career
Buffum practiced in Westmoreland and Keene, New Hampshire.

Elected as a Democratic-Republican to the Sixteenth Congress, Buffum was United States Representative for the fourth district of New Hampshire from (March 4, 1819 – March 3, 1821). After leaving the House, he was appointed judge of the court of common pleas on January 21, 1825.

Death
Buffum never married; engaged in agricultural pursuits and died in Westmoreland, Cheshire County, New Hampshire on February 24, 1874. He is interred in South Village Cemetery.

References

External links

1784 births
1874 deaths
Dartmouth College alumni
Politicians from Fitchburg, Massachusetts
New Hampshire lawyers
Democratic-Republican Party members of the United States House of Representatives from New Hampshire
19th-century American politicians
People from Westmoreland, New Hampshire
19th-century American lawyers